Potamidae is a family of freshwater crabs. It includes more than 650 species and nearly 100 genera, which are placed into two subfamilies: Potaminae and Potamiscinae.

Subfamily Potaminae
The Potaminae Ortmann, 1896 are distributed around the Mediterranean Sea, on Socotra and eastwards to Northern India.
Acanthopotamon Kemp, 1918
Alcomon Yeo & Ng, 2007
Himalayapotamon Pretzmann, 1966
Lobothelphusa Bouvier, 1917
Paratelphusula Alcock, 1909
Potamon Savigny, 1816
Socotra Cumberlidge & Wranik, 2002
Socotrapotamon Apel & Brandis, 2000

Subfamily Potamiscinae
The Potamiscinae Bott, 1970 are found in East Asia and Southeast Asia.

Acartiapotamon Dai, 1999
Allopotamon Ng, 1988
Amamiku Naruse, Segawa & Shokita, 2004
Aparapotamon Dai & G. X. Chen, 1985
Apotamonautes Dai & Xing, 1993
Artopotamon Dai & G. X. Chen, 1985
Arquatopotamon Chu, Zhou & Sun, 2017
Aspermon Yeo & Ng, 2007
Badistemon Yeo & Ng, 2007
Balssipotamon Dang & Ho, 2008
Beccumon Yeo & Ng, 2007
Bottapotamon Türkay & Dai, 1997
Candidiopotamon Bott, 1967
Carpomon S. H. Tan & Ng, 1998
Cerberusa Holthuis, 1979
Chinapotamon Dai & Naiyanetr, 1994
Cryptopotamon Ng & Dudgeon, 1992
Daipotamon Ng & Trontelj, 1996
Dalatomon Dang & Ho, 2007
Demanietta Bott, 1966
Doimon Yeo & Ng, 2007
Donopotamon Dang & Ho, 2005
Dromothelphusa Naiyanetr, 1992
Eosamon Yeo & Ng, 2007
Erebusa Yeo & Ng, 1999
Esanpotamon Naiyanetr & Ng, 1997
Flabellamon Ng, 1996
Geothelphusa Stimpson, 1858
Hainanpotamon Dai, 1995
Heterochelamon Türkay & Dai, 1997
Huananpotamon Dai & Ng, 1994
Ibanum Ng, 1995
Indochinamon Yeo & Ng, 2007
Inlethelphusa Yeo & Ng, 2007
Insulamon Ng & Takeda, 1992
Iomon Yeo & Ng, 2007
Isolapotamon Bott, 1968
Johora Bott, 1966
Kanpotamon Ng & Naiyanetr, 1993
Kukrimon Yeo & Ng, 2007: 
Lacunipotamon Dai et al., 1975
Laevimon Yeo & Ng, 2005
Larnaudia Bott, 1966
Latopotamon Dai & Türkay, 1997
Longpotamon Shih, Huang & Ng, 2016
Lophopotamon Dai, 1999
Malayopotamon Bott, 1968
Mediapotamon Türkay & Dai, 1997
Megacephalomon Yeo & Ng, 2007
Mindoron Ng & Takeda, 1992
Minpotamon Dai & Türkay, 1997
Minutomon Huang & Mao, 2014
Nakhonsimon Promdam,  Nabhitabhata & Ng, 2014
Nanhaipotamon Bott, 1968
Neilupotamon Dai & Türkay, 1997
Nemoron Ng, 1996
Neolarnaudia Türkay & Naiyanetr, 1986
Neotiwaripotamon Dai & Naiyanetr, 1994
Ovitamon Ng & Takeda, 1992
Parapotamonoides Dai, 1990
Parapotamon De Man, 1907
Pararanguna Dai & G. X. Chen, 1985
Parvuspotamon Dai & Bo, 1994
Phaibulamon Ng, 1992
Pilosamon Ng, 1996
Planumon Yeo & Ng, 2007
Potamiscus Alcock, 1909
Pudaengon Ng & Naiyanetr, 1995
Pupamon Yeo & Ng, 2007
Qianpotamon Dai, 1995
Quadramon Yeo & Ng, 2007
Rathbunamon Ng, 1996
Ryukyum Ng & Shokita, 1995
Setosamon Yeo & Ng, 2007
Shanphusa Yeo & Ng, 2007
Sinolapotamon Tai & Sung, 1975
Sinopotamon Bott, 1967
Stelomon Yeo & Naiyanetr, 2000
Stoliczia Bott, 1966
Takpotamon Brandis, 2002
Tenuilapotamon Dai et al., 1984
Tenuipotamon Dai, 1990
Teretamon Yeo & Ng, 2007
Terrapotamon Ng, 1986
Thaiphusa Ng & Naiyanetr, 1993
Thaipotamon Ng & Naiyanetr, 1993
Tiwaripotamon Bott, 1970
Tomaculamon Yeo & Ng, 1997
Trichopotamon Dai & G. X. Chen, 1985
Vadosapotamon Dai & Türkay, 1997
Vietopotamon Dang & Ho, 2002
Villopotamon Dang & Ho, 2003
Yarepotamon Dai & Türkay, 1997
Yuebeipotamon Huang, Shih & Mao, 2016
Yuexipotamon Huang & Mao, 2014

References

External links

Potamoidea
Decapod families